Benjamin Weir (December 20, 1923 – October 14, 2016) was an American hostage in Lebanon in 1985.

Background
Weir, who with his wife Carol served as missionaries in Lebanon with the Presbyterian Church (USA) for nearly 30 years, was kidnapped off the streets of Beirut in May 1984. The kidnapping was done by an Islamic fundamentalist group, Islamic Jihad, that later evolved into Hezbollah. He was freed 16 months later in exchange for US anti-tank weapons, as part of the Iran-Contra Affair. Shortly thereafter he was elected moderator of the 1986 General Assembly of the Presbyterian Church, the highest elected office in that denomination.

He remained one of the world's most respected voices for peace and reconciliation in the Middle East for the past 30 years.

The book Hostage Bound Hostage Free tells the story of his captivity from his perspective as well as his wife's.

While a student at UC Berkeley, Weir was initiated into the Beta chapter of Alpha Gamma Omega, a Christ-centered fraternity. Later he attended San Francisco Theological Seminary.

Weir died on October 14, 2016.

See also
List of kidnappings
List of solved missing person cases

References

1923 births
1980s missing person cases
2016 deaths
American expatriates in Lebanon
American people taken hostage
Formerly missing people
Kidnapped people
Kidnappings by Islamists
Missing person cases in Lebanon
Presbyterian Church (USA) teaching elders
University of California, Berkeley alumni